Lowther is a locality in New South Wales, Australia.

References

External links

Towns in New South Wales